The Exo L'Assomption and Terrebonne–Mascouche sector is responsible for organising public transportation services throughout the administrative region of Lanaudière, northeast of Montreal, in central Quebec, Canada.

The Quebec Ministry of Transport produced a report in 1999 which analyzed the Lanaudière region's transport problems. This report overwhelmingly favoured a public transportation service managed within the region instead of the integration of existing public transit in L'Assomption and Les Moulins with either of the large Montreal (STM) or Laval (STL) systems. The result of this was the creation of the Conseil régional de transport Lanaudière in 2002, under the management of the six regional county municipalities of D'Autray, Joliette, L'Assomption, Matawinie, Montcalm and Les Moulins, with additional transit user representation on the board. This also required each MRC to manage operations in their territory, with a structure which may vary depending on different local needs. In June 2017,  Quebec Ministry of Transport approved the law 76, which modified the transport gouvernance of transport entities in the Metropolitan Region of Montréal. The Administration of the CRTL was transferred to the MRC de Joliette – Division Transport, as well as the CTJM (Corporation de Transport Joliette-Métropolitain) and the TAJM (Transport Adapté Joliette-Mértopolitain) got implemented into the MRC de Joliette's transport division the same date.

Services
The southern municipalities within the region are still serviced by Réseau de transport métropolitain Terrebonne-Mascouche and Réseau de transport métropolitain L'Assomption, while the communities at a longer distance from Montreal are the ones that are being served by  Transport MRC de Joliette (Interurban Routes). Specialized accessible transportation is administered locally within each member regional county municipality.

Bus Terminals
 Terminus Repentigny
 Terminus Terrebonne
 Terminus Joliette
 This small office, located at 942, rue St-Louis in Joliette, is owned and operated by Transport MRC de Joliette  and is not part of the RTM system, but is partnered with it.
Picture of Terminus Joliette CRT Lanaudière

Bus routes

See also 
 Exo (public transit) bus services
 Keolis

References

External links
 Transit History of Montreal suburbs, Conseil Intermunicipal de Transport (CIT)

Exo (public transit)
Transit agencies in Quebec
Transport in Lanaudière
Transport in Repentigny, Quebec
Transport in Terrebonne, Quebec